Kalateh-ye Malek (also Romanized as Kalāteh-ye Malek) is a village in Khusf Rural District, Central District, Khusf County, South Khorasan Province, Iran. At the 2006 census, its population was 199, in 57 families.

References 

Populated places in Khusf County